Troy Evans (born February 16, 1948) is an American actor who is perhaps best known for his role as Desk Clerk Francis "Frank" Martin in the television drama series ER, and more recently for his role as Detective II Johnson (Barrel) in Amazon's TV series Bosch. He has also appeared in Ace Ventura: Pet Detective, Under Siege, Teen Wolf, Kuffs, Fear and Loathing in Las Vegas, Black Dahlia, Demolition Man, The Frighteners, Tiger Cruise, View from the Top and Article 99 among others. He voiced Thistle Jinn in the 2013 animated adventure film Epic.

He served with the 25th Infantry Division in Vietnam, and was later cast as SFC Bob Pepper in the TV series China Beach which was set during the Vietnam War.

Selected filmography
Rhinestone (1984) – Rhinestone Heckler / Bettor
Teen Wolf (1985) – Dragon Basketball Coach
Modern Girls (1986) – Club Owner
Near Dark (1987) – Plainclothes Officer
Planes, Trains and Automobiles (1987) – Antisocial Trucker (uncredited)
Shadows in the Storm (1988) – Det. Harris
Deadly Dreams (1988) – Sheriff
Martians Go Home (1989) – Cop
Halloween 5: The Revenge of Michael Myers (1989) – Illinois State Police Trooper Charlie Bloch
Pastime (1990) – Art
Men at Work (1990) – Capt. Leo Dalton
My Blue Heaven (1990) – Nicky 
Twin Peaks (1990) – Principal Wolchek
Article 99 (1992) – Pat Travis
Kuffs (1992) – Captain Morino
The Lawnmower Man (1992) – Lt. Goodwin
Under Siege (1992) – Granger
Demolition Man (1993) – James MacMillan the Tough Cop
The Stand (1994) – Sheriff John Baker
Ace Ventura: Pet Detective (1994) – Roger Podactor
Phenomenon (1996) – Roger 
The Frighteners (1996) – Sheriff Walt Perry 
Fear and Loathing in Las Vegas (1998) – Michigan Police Chief
My Favorite Martian (1999) – Captain Dalton 
Tiger Cruise (2004) – Chuck Horner
Epic (2013) – Thistle Jinn (voice)
The Book of Life (2014) – Old Man Hemmingway (voice)
Bosch (2015–2021) – Detective Johnson (Barrel)

References

External links

Living people
American male film actors
American male television actors
People from Missoula, Montana
Male actors from Montana
United States Army soldiers
20th-century American male actors
21st-century American male actors
1948 births